Erling Asbjørn Kjellsby (7 July 1901 - 20 February 1976) was a Norwegian organist and composer.

Biography 
Kjellsby was born and died in Oslo, Norway. After examen artium (1920) he studied at a teacher training college and an organ school (including under Brustad).  After a period of time studying under Fartein Valen
he debuted in 1933.  He was appointed to organize in Uranienborg kirke (1936) and was appointed as a teacher of music at
Oslo lærerhøgskole (1938) where he was the school choirmaster  many years, and often figured in the broadcasting NRK. His composition contributions was more neo-romantic and neoclassical, including several works for choir, string quartets, larger orchestras, organ, and piano. By romances could be mentioned Skummel natt ved Troldtjernet, recorded by Kjell Bækkelund on the album Arietta.

As an organizational man, he was long-term board member of the Norwegian Society of Composers and Chairman of TONO (1945–1962), as well as in the management of musician groups at Oslo Filharmoniske Orkester and the national organization for organists. He also conducted the Oslo Arbeidersangforening.

References 

20th-century composers
1976 deaths
1901 births
Norwegian conductors (music)
Male conductors (music)
Composers from Oslo
Norwegian male composers
Norwegian organists
Male organists
20th-century organists
20th-century conductors (music)
20th-century Norwegian male musicians